Alan Anton may refer to:

 Alan Anton (musician), bassist of the Cowboy Junkies
 Alan Anton (footballer) (1933–1994), Australian rules footballer